Brainard is a surname. Notable people with the surname include:

 Asa Brainard (1841–1888), American baseball pitcher
 Bertha Brainard (1890–1946), American broadcast executive
 Byron B. Brainard (1894–1940), Los Angeles City Council member
 Cam Brainard (born 1962), American voice actor and radio personality
 Cecilia Manguerra Brainard (born 1947), Filipino American writer
 Charles L. Brainard (1903–1988), American presidential library commissioner
 Daniel Brainard (1812–1866), American surgeon
 David H. Brainard (born 1960), American psychologist and vision researcher
 David L. Brainard (1856–1949), American Arctic explorer and soldier
Edwin H. Brainard (1882–1957), American Marine aviation pioneer
 Ingrid Brainard (1925–2000), dance historian
 J. Edwin Brainard, Lieutenant Governor of Connecticut
 James Brainard Mayor of Carmel, Indiana.
 Jeremiah Gates Brainard (c. 1759–1830), Justice of the Connecticut Supreme Court
 Joe Brainard (1942–1994), American artist
 John Gardiner Calkins Brainard (1795–1828), American lawyer, editor and poet
 Josh Brainard, ex-guitarist for Slipknot
 Lael Brainard, member of the U.S. Federal Reserve Board of Governors
 Mary Gardiner Brainard (1837–1905), American writer of religious poetry
 Michael Brainard (born 1965), American actor
 William Brainard, American Economist